The FBA 21 and 23 were small flying boat airliners built in France in the mid-1920s. Their development was an attempt by FBA to develop a commercial version of their FBA 19 bomber which had failed to attract orders from military buyers. Retaining the same basic design as their predecessor, the Model 21 added an enclosed cabin for four passengers. Unfortunately for FBA, they aroused as little interest as their military counterparts, and only a handful were built in a number of slight variations, including one example of a dedicated mail plane.

In 1926, Maurice Noguès had recently joined Compagnie des Messageries Transaériennes (CMT) and was looking for an aircraft to use on a new Paris-Saigon route. Accordingly, FBA rebuilt one of the Type 21s to optimise it for long-distance flight and redesignated it the Type 23. The W-12 engine was replaced with a radial, and the aircraft was generally lightened to allow for greater fuel capacity. Painted bright orange, the aircraft was extensively tested throughout late 1926, and apart from an early mishap while being flown by Noguès himself, flew over  without incident. Nevertheless, the CMT contract went to the CAMS 53 and no further examples of the type were built.

Variants

21/1 HMT.5amphibian airliner with Hispano-Suiza 12Ga W-12 engine (3 built)
21/2amphibian airliner with Lorraine 12Eb W-12 engine (2 built)
21/3flying boat airliner with Gnome et Rhône 9Ab radial engine (1 converted from 21/1)
21/4 HT.3amphibian mailplane with Lorraine 12Ed W-12 engine (1 converted from 21/2)
23long-distance flying boat airliner with Gnome et Rhône 9Ab radial engine (1 converted from 21/1)

Specifications (21/1)

References

Further reading

External links
 Уголок неба

1920s French airliners
Flying boats
FBA aircraft
Biplanes
Single-engined tractor aircraft